Miller Tavern and Farm is a historic home and farm located near Martinsburg, Berkeley County, West Virginia. The main house is "L" shaped and consists of a vernacular tavern building, built about 1813, to which is appended a Greek Revival-style "I"-house built about 1831.  The house of painted brick and wood construction. It has an intersecting gable roof structure clad in standing seam metal.  Also on the contributing property is the Dr. John Magruder House (c. 1880), privy (c. 1935), smokehouse (c. 1900), barn (c. 1900), bank barn (c. 1900), and two sheds (c. 1900).

It was listed on the National Register of Historic Places in 2006.

References

Farms on the National Register of Historic Places in West Virginia
Houses on the National Register of Historic Places in West Virginia
Greek Revival houses in West Virginia
Houses completed in 1813
Houses completed in 1831
Houses in Berkeley County, West Virginia
National Register of Historic Places in Berkeley County, West Virginia
Vernacular architecture in West Virginia
I-houses in West Virginia
Drinking establishments on the National Register of Historic Places in West Virginia